Europa Huang (born November 2, 1983) is a Taiwanese singer-songwriter, producer and occupational therapist.

He won an award given by the Ministry of Culture, Taiwan for the Best New Artist at the 18th Golden Melody Awards for his 2006  debut album Over the Way,.  In 2017 Huang won the Best Composer award at the 28th Golden Melody Awards for the song "Centrifugal Force".

Personal life
Huang attended the National Experimental High School, and graduated from the National Cheng Kung University in Tainan, with a degree in occupational therapy.

Discography

Studio albums

Extended plays

Singles

Songs written

Albums produced

Awards and nominations

References

External links
 
 

1983 births
Living people
People from Hsinchu
21st-century Taiwanese male singers
National Cheng Kung University alumni
Taiwanese male singer-songwriters
Taiwanese record producers
Occupational therapists